Gold is a compilation album of 36 songs from Etta James. Unlike many collections, this two-disc album presents an overview of her work over five decades, rather than presenting a more in-depth look at the singer's heyday.

Track listing
Disc 1

Disc 2

See also
 Etta James discography#Singles

References

2007 compilation albums
Etta James albums
Hip-O Records compilation albums